Kampong Kapok is a village in the north-east of Brunei-Muara District, Brunei, near Muara town.

Geography 
Kampong Kapok is one of the villages in Mukim Serasa, a mukim in the district. As a village subdivision, it borders Kampong Sabun to the north-east, Kampong Serasa to the east and south, Kampong Salar to the south-west and Kampong Meragang to the west and north.

It is one of the villages along Jalan Muara, a road which links Bandar Seri Begawan to Muara town.

Facilities

Schools 
 Kapok Primary School — a government primary school 
 SECA School — a private primary school

Mosque 
Kampong Kapok Mosque is the village mosque; it was completed in 1996 and can accommodate 700 worshippers.

Recreation 
It was inaugurated in 2013 by the then Minister of Home Affairs. The park has walkways built along the trails in the forest and provides hiking opportunity.

Achievement 
In 2014, the village won the Silver Medal of the Excellent Village Award, a national award recognising initiatives by villages in improving social and socio-economic conditions of their communities. It is the first village in the country to achieve the aforementioned medal recognition.

References 

Kapok